Ángel Floro Martínez (24 February 1940 – 14 March 2023) was a Spanish Roman Catholic prelate. He was bishop of Gokwe from 2000 to 2017. Floro died on 14 March 2023, at the age of 83.

References

1940 births
2023 deaths
Spanish Roman Catholic bishops
Bishops in Zimbabwe
21st-century Roman Catholic bishops in Zimbabwe
Bishops appointed by Pope John Paul II
Recipients of the Order of Isabella the Catholic
People from the Province of Albacete